Super Shell is a Somali football club based in  Afgoye,  Somalia.   It took 6th place in 2011.

See also
Football in Somalia

References

Football clubs in Somalia